Hedyosmum is a genus of flowering plants in the family Chloranthaceae. There are about 40 to 45 species. They are distributed in Central and South America and the West Indies, and one species also occurs in southeastern Asia. They are mostly dioecious, except for H. nutans and H. brenesii which are exclusively monoecious, and H. scaberrimum and H. costaricense with both monoecious and dioecious individuals.

Species 

 Hedyosmum angustifolium
 Hedyosmum anisodorum
 Hedyosmum arborescens
 Hedyosmum bonplandianum 
 Hedyosmum brasiliense
 Hedyosmum brenesii
 Hedyosmum burgerianum 
 Hedyosmum colombianum
 Hedyosmum correanum 
 Hedyosmum costaricense
 Hedyosmum crenatum
 Hedyosmum cuatrecazanum
 Hedyosmum cumbalense
 Hedyosmum dombeyanum
 Hedyosmum domingense
 Hedyosmum gentryi
 Hedyosmum goudotianum
 Hedyosmum huascari
 Hedyosmum intermedium
 Hedyosmum lechleri
 Hedyosmum luteynii
 Hedyosmum maximum
 Hedyosmum mexicanum
 Hedyosmum narinoense
 Hedyosmum neblinae
 Hedyosmum nutans
 Hedyosmum orientale
 Hedyosmum parvifolium
 Hedyosmum peruvianum
 Hedyosmum pseudoandromeda
 Hedyosmum pungens
 Hedyosmum purpurascens
 Hedyosmum racemosum
 Hedyosmum scaberrimum
 Hedyosmum scabrum
 Hedyosmum spectabile
 Hedyosmum sprucei
 Hedyosmum steinii
 Hedyosmum strigosum
 Hedyosmum subintegrum
 Hedyosmum tepuiense
 Hedyosmum translucidum
 Hedyosmum uniflorum

References

External links
Field Museum Botanical Specimens

 
Angiosperm genera
Taxonomy articles created by Polbot
Taxa named by Olof Swartz
Dioecious plants